Fabrício Bento da Silva (born 1 May 1975), known as Fabrício Bento or just Fabrício, is a Brazilian professional football manager and former player who played as a central defender. He is the current manager of Avaí's under-17 team.

Playing career
Born in São Paulo, Fabrício began his career with hometown side Portuguesa. In 2002, after loans at São José-SP, Avaí and Mogi Mirim, he moved abroad with Beitar Jerusalem in Israel.

Fabrício returned to his home country in 2003, with Corinthians Alagoano, but returned to Israel in the following year after signing for Maccabi Ahi Nazareth. He then represented Anapolina for a short period before returning to Beitar Jerusalem.

After a short period back at Anapolina, Fabrício subsequently played for Juventus-SP before joining Série A side Juventude in April 2006. Initially a starter, he lost his starting spot and moved to Avaí in June 2007.

On 5 February 2009, Fabrício was presented at Catanduvense. He signed for Sendas in the following year, and retired in 2011 at the age of 35.

Managerial career
In 2013, after a period working as an assistant coach at Operário Ferroviário, he returned to Avaí and was named manager of the under-15 squad.

Fabrício worked as coach of the under-17 and under-20 squads, before being named interim manager of the main squad on 7 February 2022, after the departure of Claudinei Oliveira.

Honours

Manager
Biguaçu
Campeonato Catarinense Divisão de Acesso: 2011

References

External links
 Futebol de Goyaz profile 
 

1975 births
Living people
Brazilian footballers
Association football defenders
Campeonato Brasileiro Série A players
Campeonato Brasileiro Série B players
Associação Portuguesa de Desportos players
São José Esporte Clube players
Avaí FC players
Mogi Mirim Esporte Clube players
Sport Club Corinthians Alagoano players
Associação Atlética Anapolina players
Clube Atlético Juventus players
Esporte Clube Juventude players
Grêmio Catanduvense de Futebol players
Audax Rio de Janeiro Esporte Clube players
Israeli Premier League players
Beitar Jerusalem F.C. players
Maccabi Ahi Nazareth F.C. players
Brazilian expatriate footballers
Brazilian expatriate sportspeople in Israel
Expatriate footballers in Israel
Brazilian football managers
Avaí FC managers
Footballers from São Paulo